Bonneville High School is a four-year public secondary school near Idaho Falls, Idaho. Northeast of the city, it opened in 1951 and is the original high school of the Bonneville Joint School District #93, which consolidated ten smaller districts east of Idaho Falls. The original building for high school was turned into a junior high in 1977 when the current Bonneville High School was built. A second traditional high school in the district opened in 1992, Hillcrest in Ammon, and Bonneville now serves the northern portion. The school colors are green and gold and the mascot is a bee. Current enrollment is approximately 1,400.
In 1950 the vote was put forward to bring together 10 little schools, some of them were Iona, Lincoln, Ammon, and Ucon. It passed however there was not a school for them to attend. The school that had the largest building at the time was Ammon so the high school students would attend there until a building could be built. The first class attended 1951 - 1952. As with some of the other new schools, the first graduating class could nominate the colors and mascot. The colors of a favorite football team was nominated, Green Bay Packers. 
In 1957 the "new" high school was built. It is the current Rocky Mountain Middle School. 
The students outgrew the high school and did split sessions in the 1970s while a new high school was being built next door. The first class to graduate from the current building was 1978.

Athletics
Bonneville competes in athletics in IHSAA Class 5A, the highest classification in the state. It is currently a member of the High Country Conference (5A), with Hillcrest High School, Skyline High School and Idaho Falls High School.

Rivalries
Bonneville's rival is Hillcrest, which opened in 1992. The original rival was Idaho Falls, before Skyline arrived in the late 1960s. Bonneville and Hillcrest will join Idaho Falls and Skyline in the 4A classification starting in 2018.

State titles
Boys

 Soccer (2): fall (4A) 2007, 2010 (introduced in 2000)
 Basketball (1): (4A) 2003 
 Baseball (2): (A-1, now 5A) 1992, (4A) 2013  (records not kept by IHSAA, state tourney introduced in 1971)

Girls

 Volleyball (8): fall (A-1, now 5A) 1991, 1996, 1998; (4A) 2001, 2004, 2007, 2009; (5A) 2016 (introduced in 1976)
 Basketball (2): (4A) 2005, 2007  (introduced in 1976)

 Tennis (2): (4A) 2010, 2011  (combined team until 2008)

Notable alumni
John L. Smith, college football head coach, class of 1967.
Mark Asper, NFL guard with Jacksonville Jaguars, class of 2004.

References

External links
 

Public high schools in Idaho
Buildings and structures in Idaho Falls, Idaho
Schools in Bonneville County, Idaho
1951 establishments in Idaho